This is a list of notable students and staff of The Evergreen State College (Evergreen), an accredited public liberal arts college and a member of the Council of Public Liberal Arts Colleges. Evergreen is located in Olympia, Washington, United States.

Notable alumni

Academia
 Thomas Herndon, economist
 Matthew Frye Jacobson, historian, professor
 Douglas Kahn, historian of sound, media arts, and science and technology studies
 Robert W. McChesney, university professor in communications and media studies
Joyce McConnell, first female president of Colorado State University
 Russell Potter, novelist and college professor
 David Price, anthropologist
 Douglas Robinson, professor of English, dean, best known as a translation scholar
 Roger Stritmatter, professor of humanities and one of the leading modern-day advocates of the Oxfordian theory of Shakespeare authorship

Activists
 Rachel Corrie, International Solidarity Movement political activist, killed in Gaza by Israel Defense Forces
 Saab Lofton, author, activist

Business
 Bruce Pavitt, founder of Sub Pop Records
 Bre Pettis, entrepreneur; co-founder of MakerBot Industries, NYC Resistor

Criminals
 Mechele Linehan, convicted murderer
 Andrew Mickel, activist sentenced to death for murder of a California police officer
 Scott Scurlock (1955–1996), robbed 17 banks in the Northwest
 Justin Solondz, convicted felon, convicted in the University of Washington firebombing incident
 Briana Waters, convicted felon, convicted in the University of Washington firebombing incident

Entertainment, visual arts and media
 Tom Anderson, artist
 Katie Baldwin, artist
 Lynda Barry, cartoonist and author
 Craig Bartlett, cartoonist and animator for Rugrats and Hey Arnold!; married to Lisa Groening, Matt Groening's sister
 Josh Blue, stand-up comedian, winner of Last Comic Standing, member of US Men's Paralympic Soccer Team
 Violetta Blue, adult film star
 Robert Meyer Burnett, filmmaker; writer-director of Free Enterprise; producer of The Hills Run Red, Agent Cody Banks
 Charles Burns, cartoonist
 Tammy Rae Carland, artist
 Steve De Jarnatt, director of cult films Miracle Mile and Cherry 2000
 Matt Groening, cartoonist, creator of Life in Hell, The Simpsons, and Futurama
 Byron Howard, director and story artist at Walt Disney Feature Animation; lead character animator on Lilo & Stitch and Brother Bear; director of Bolt and Tangled
 Clayton Kauzlaric, artist, animator, game designer noted for work on Total Annihilation, Voodoo Vince and DeathSpank
 Megan Kelso, cartoonist
 Michael Leavitt (artist), fine art sculptor and toy maker
 Audrey Marrs, Academy Award-winning film producer and Sundance Film Festival award winner
 Nikki McClure, illustrator of New York Times best-selling children's book All in a Day
 Jared Pappas-Kelley, artist
 Heather Rae, filmmaker
 Michael Richards, actor, known as the popular character Cosmo Kramer on the TV show Seinfeld
 Don Roff, writer and filmmaker
 Liz Sales, artist
 Dana Simpson, cartoonist, creator of Phoebe and her Unicorn, and Ozy and Millie Margaret Stratton, photographer and video artist
John Taylor, reality television star of Too Fat for 15: Fighting Back
 Steve Thomas, host of the PBS show This Old House Cappy Thompson, artist
 Jennifer West, artist and filmmaker
 Tay Zonday, internet personality, musician, voice actor
 Molly Zuckerman-Hartung, artist

Government
 Jessica Bateman, member of the Washington House of Representatives
Elizabeth Furse, former United States congresswoman
 Dennis Heck, United States congressman
Maia Bellon, former Washington Secretary of Ecology
 Yuh-Line Niou, 2002–present; New York State Assembly member whose district includes Chinatown 
 Terry Oliver, Bonneville Power Administration's chief technology innovation officer
 Christine Quinn-Brintnall, Washington State Court of Appeals judge
 Kevin Ranker, Washington state senator, 40th district
 Sharon Tomiko Santos, Washington state representative, 37th district

Literature
 Maile Chapman, author
 John Bellamy Foster, co-editor, Monthly Review Thorn Kief Hillsbery, author
 Benjamin Hoff, writer, The Tao of Pooh Steve House, Piolet d’Or Award recipient
 Tom Maddox, science fiction writer 
 Robert W. McChesney, co-editor, Monthly Review Judith Moore, author of the novel Fat Girl: A True Story Inga Muscio, author of book Cunt: A Declaration of Independence Leslie Rule, non-fiction author, novelist, paranormal writer
 Ken Silverstein, investigative journalist

Music
 Carrie Brownstein, musician in band Sleater-Kinney and co-star in the television series Portlandia''
 Martin Courtney, musician in the band Real Estate
 Kimya Dawson, musician
 Heather Duby, musician
 Timo Ellis, musician
 Phil Elverum, musician
 Steve Fisk, musician, audio engineer, and producer
 Ely Guerra, singer-songwriter
 Kathleen Hanna, musician in Bikini Kill, Le Tigre, and The Julie Ruin
 Calvin Johnson, composer, musician, audio producer and founder of K Records
 Conrad Keely, vocalist/guitarist of indie rock band …And You Will Know Us by the Trail of Dead
 Nomy Lamm, singer, songwriter, activist, accordionist
 Macklemore, born Ben Haggerty, rapper
 Lois Maffeo, musician
 Mirah, born Mirah Zeitlyn, recording artist
 Molly Neuman, musician in band Bratmobile, recording artist 
 Casey Neill, musician, singer, songwriter, leader of the band Casey Neill & the Norway Rats
 David Rovics, musician, political folk
 Jeff Sherman, musician in band Glass
 Justin Trosper, musician in band Unwound
 Corin Tucker, musician in band Sleater-Kinney
 Tobi Vail, musician in band Bikini Kill
 Kathi Wilcox, musician in band Bikini Kill
 John Wozniak, musician in band Marcy Playground, record producer

Science
 Holly Hagen (epidemiologist). professor, College of Global Public Health, New York University, and director of the Center for Drug Use and HIV/HCV Research.
 Paul Stamets, mycologist

Sports
 Joey Gjertsen, soccer player with San Jose Earthquakes of Major League Soccer

Faculty and staff
 Stephanie Coontz, historian
 Daniel J. Evans, former governor of Washington
 Elizabeth Kutter, biologist
 Bill Ransom, science fiction author
 Gail Tremblay, poet and artist
 Willi Unsoeld, mountaineer (deceased)
 Sean Williams, ethnomusicologist
 Miranda Mellis, author

References

Evergreen State College people
Evergreen State College people